Tatia Dumbadse (born 21 August 1998) is a Georgian footballer who plays as a midfielder. She has played officially for the senior Georgia women's national team.

International career
Dumbadse capped for Georgia at senior level during the UEFA Women's Euro 2017 qualifying Group 6, in a 0–3 home loss to Northern Ireland on 24 October 2015 and a 0–4 away loss to Switzerland three days later.

References

1998 births
Living people
Women's association football midfielders
Women's footballers from Georgia (country)
Georgia (country) women's international footballers
Expatriate women's footballers from Georgia (country)
Expatriate sportspeople from Georgia (country) in the United States
Expatriate women's soccer players in the United States